Bennette Misalucha is an American politician who served as a member of the Hawaii Senate for the 16th district from 2020 to 2022. She was appointed to the seat after incumbent Democrat Breene Harimoto died. She won election to a full term in the seat in 2020, defeating Republican candidate Kelly Puamailani Kitashima, 52.7% to 47.3%.

She was born and raised in the Philippines but migrated to Hawaii in the early 1980s.

References

Living people
Democratic Party Hawaii state senators
21st-century American politicians
Year of birth missing (living people)